Muhammad Essa Khan (born on 20 November 1983) is a Pakistani former footballer who played as a forward. Essa is one of the most well known faces in Pakistani football, due to his regular goal scoring at the international level.

Club career 
Born in the football-mad city of Chaman in Pakistan's Balochistan province, he played in the Afghan Football Club Chaman youth team before signing for PTCL FC, with whom he won the old PFF President's Cup in 2003. In the inaugural Pakistan Premier League season in 2004, he returned to his home town club Afghan FC Chaman, with his goals helping them to survive relegation. The following season, he transferred to WAPDA, but could not help them retain their Pakistan Premier League title; finishing second to Pakistan Army. 

In 2005, he was offered a playing contract from major Indian football team East Bengal Club, but the Pakistan Football Federation seemingly turned it down. He moved to Khan Rsearch Laboratories, and helped them finish third in the 2006–07 season. The same year, he played in the Geo Super Football League for Quetta Zorawar as captain. Although his team came second in the league round and lost in the semi-final in the knock-out round of the tournament, he was awarded the SFL 2007 Player of the Tournament trophy. 

On 13 August 2007, was awarded the Salaam Pakistan Award alongside tennis star Aisam-ul-Haq Qureshi and female squash player Maria Toorpakai for their contributions to sport by the President of Pakistan, Pervez Musharraf.

In 2009, he opened an academy at his home town in Chaman, called the Essa Khan Academy.

International career 
He was discovered by then Pakistan youth team and under-23 manager John Layton back in early 1999, and found his way into the Pakistan national football team soon enough, receiving his first cap in 2000. In 2004, Essa was called up to the Pakistan U-23 squad for the 2004 South Asian games. He ended the tournament as top scorer and was player of the tournament, and helped Pakistan win the gold medal.

Essa’s most famous moment came when he scored from a free-kick against India in the first match of the 2005 Pakistan-India friendly series, at the Ayub National Stadium, Quetta to tie the game 1–1 with minutes to go before the final whistle. He scored again in the 3-0 win against India at the Punjab Stadium in Lahore.

In 2006, he captained Pakistan at the 2006 South Asian Games, winning another gold medal. He retained his captaincy for the 2008 AFC Challenge Cup qualification campaign. Despite a 2–0 win against Chinese Taipei in the first match, Pakistan lost 7–1 to Sri Lanka, which made Pakistan's 9–2 demolition of Guam meaningless as they finished behind on points to Sri Lanka, thus failing to qualify for the main round. Because of injury, Essa had to miss the 2008 SAFF Championship.

He retired from the national team during the 2009 SAFF Championship, after a fallout with the international team manager György Kottán.

International statistics

Honours
Pakistan Telecommunication
Pakistan National Football Challenge Cup: 2003

Khan Research Laboratories
Pakistan Premier League: 2009–10
National Challenge Cup: 2009

K-Electric
Pakistan Premier League: 2014–15

Pakistan
South Asian Games Gold: 2004, 2006

References

External links 
 

1983 births
Living people
Pakistani footballers
Pakistan international footballers
Pashtun people
People from Killa Abdullah District
WAPDA F.C. players
Afghan FC Chaman players
Khan Research Laboratories F.C. players
K-Electric F.C. players
Footballers at the 2002 Asian Games
Footballers at the 2006 Asian Games
Association football forwards
South Asian Games gold medalists for Pakistan
Asian Games competitors for Pakistan
South Asian Games medalists in football